Juan René Serrano Gutiérrez (born 23 February 1984 in Guadalajara, Jalisco) is an athlete from Mexico. He competes in archery.

Serrano competed at the 2004 Summer Olympics in men's individual archery.  He won his first match, advancing to the round of 32.  In the second round of elimination, he was defeated. His final rank was 20th overall.

Serrano was also a member of the 12th-place Mexican men's archery team at the 2004 Summer Olympics.

Rene Serrano won 3rd place at the Archery World Cup in Turkey – Antalya 2007.

Rene Serrano Won 2nd place overall in the 2007 Archery World Cup Final held in Dubai, United Arab Emirates. He defeated Alan Wills in the semi-finals but lost to Baljinima Tsyrempilov in the finals.

2008 Summer Olympics
At the 2008 Summer Olympics in Beijing, Serrano finished his ranking round with a total of 679 points, the highest score, one point in front of Mangal Singh Champia and Viktor Ruban. This gave him the first seed for the final competition bracket in which he faced Joseph Muaausa in the first round, beating the Samoan 116–88. In the second round Serrano was too strong for Daniel Morillo (112–111) and via Maksim Kunda (110–106) in the third round he advanced to the quarter finals. There he had no problem beating Vic Wunderle 113–106. In the semi final he came into trouble and was unable to win his match against South Korean Park Kyung-Mo (112–115). In the bronze medal match he was not capable to recover from his defeat and Bair Badënov took the medal with 115–110.

2011 Pan American Games
Serrano was named the flag bearer for the Mexico at the 2011 Pan American Games.

Individual performance timeline

References

External links
 

1984 births
Living people
Mexican male archers
Archers at the 2004 Summer Olympics
Archers at the 2007 Pan American Games
Archers at the 2008 Summer Olympics
Archers at the 2011 Pan American Games
Archers at the 2015 Pan American Games
Archers at the 2012 Summer Olympics
Olympic archers of Mexico
Sportspeople from Guadalajara, Jalisco
Pan American Games gold medalists for Mexico
Pan American Games silver medalists for Mexico
Pan American Games bronze medalists for Mexico
Pan American Games medalists in archery
Medalists at the 2011 Pan American Games
Medalists at the 2015 Pan American Games